KCBS-TV/FM Tower (formerly the KNXT/KNX-FM Tower) is a 296.4 meter (972 ft) high guyed radio/television tower on Mount Wilson above Los Angeles (near the Mount Wilson Observatory) at 123 CBS Lane. The KCBS-TV/FM Tower was built in 1986. It was owned by CBS Corporation and used by KCBS-TV (Channel 2) and KCBS-FM (93.1 MHz, 27,500 watts). When the DTV conversion was planned the CBS transmitters (both of them) were installed in the Channel 9 building and combined onto one antenna. The guyed tower facility, the westernmost on Mount Wilson, was sold in November 2009 to Richland Towers whose headquarters is in Tampa, Florida. However, as part of the spectrum auction repack, KCBS-TV moved back to the tower.

See also
List of masts

References

External links
 
 List of Mount Wilson broadcasters

Towers completed in 1986
Paramount Global
Radio masts and towers in the United States
Towers in California
1986 establishments in California
Buildings and structures in Los Angeles